Shachokol is a village in Leh district of the Indian union territory of Ladakh. It is located in the Durbuk tehsil.

Demographics
According to the 2011 census of India, Shachokol has 147 households. The effective literacy rate (i.e. the literacy rate of population excluding children aged 6 and below) is 68.48%.

References

Villages in Durbuk tehsil